Anglo-Chinese Convention may refer to:

 Chefoo Convention in 1876
 Convention of Calcutta in 1890
 Convention for the Extension of Hong Kong Territory in 1898
 Convention Between Great Britain and China Respecting Tibet in 1906